Melinda Y. Cohen is an American film and television actress.

Background 
Cohen was born in Stony Brook, New York and at the age of 5, moved to Hamburg in Germany, her mother's home country. She returned to New York when she was 10 and later moved to Boston where she joined improv groups at Tufts University. She returned to Germany when she was 19, to study Cologne's Film Acting School where she got her debut acting in Smoqing, a short film by Daryush Shokof.

Filmography

References

External links 
 
 

Actresses from New York (state)
American film actresses
American television actresses
American voice actresses
American people of German descent
People from Stony Brook, New York
Female models from New York (state)
Living people
American expatriates in Germany
Year of birth missing (living people)